The 1952 Small Club World Cup was the first edition of the Small Club World Cup, a tournament held in Venezuela between 1952 and 1957, and in 1963 and in 1965. It was played by four participants, 1 from Europe and 3 from South America, playing in a double round-robin format.

The championship featured players such as Alfredo Di Stéfano, Adolfo Pedernera, and Nestor Rossi for Millonarios, Miguel Muñoz for Real Madrid, among others. Real Madrid was the only team that did not participate as champion of its country.

Participants

Matches

Final standing 

Notes

Topscorers

Champion

References

1952
1952 in South American football
1952 in Brazilian football
1952 in Colombian football
1952 in Venezuelan sport
1952–53 in Spanish football